Oleksandríja, also Aleksandria, is a village in Rivne Raion, Rivne Oblast, Ukraine. , the community had 2397 residents. Postal code — 35320. KOATUU code — 5624680401.

History
The Germans occupied the city during War War II from 1941 - 1944. A witness recounted of the Germans' occupation: "When they arrived, the German soldiers burned the synagogue near the river and set fire to the Jewish houses. They were terrible. The Jews tried to take the furniture from their houses so it wouldn’t burn."

References

External links 
 Web-site of Oleksandriia 
 Aleksandria in the New York Public Library 
 Weather in the Oleksandriia 

Villages in Rivne Raion
Holocaust locations in Ukraine